Sooliman Ernest "Rogie" or S. E. Rogie (1926 – 4 July 1994) was a highlife and palm wine guitarist and singer from Sierra Leone.

Biography
Sooliman Ernest Rogers was born in 1926 in the town of Fonikoh, Pujehun District in southern Province Sierra Leone. He began performing early, while supporting himself as a tailor, and he came to use his nickname "Rogie" as his official surname. In the 1960s, he became a professional musician, singing in four languages. His hits include "Koneh Pehlawo", "Go Easy with Me" and "My Lovely Elizabeth". He formed a band called The Morningstars in 1965. In 1973 Rogie left Africa and travelled to the United States. There he performed at elementary and high schools across California, and received awards from the US Congress and Senate, the cities of Berkeley and Oakland, California.

In 1988, after being invited by British disc jockey Andy Kershaw, Rogie moved to England, where he bought a home in Finchley. In 1991, he put together a band, The Palm-Wine Tappers, and toured the UK. He died on 4 July 1994 at the age of 68, shortly after recording his last album, Dead Men Don't Smoke Marijuana. He had undergone heart bypass surgery in February but against medical advice travelled to perform in Russia, where he lost consciousness while performing onstage. He died at Lewisham Hospital, South London, having been flown by air ambulance from Estonia.

See also
 African fingerstyle guitar

Discography
"Waitin Make You Do Me So" / "Some One Some Where" (7" UK single) (credited as S. E. Rogers) (1964)
African Lady - Highlife Music From West Africa (1975) (credited as Souleman Rowgie)
Mother Africa, I Won't Forget You (1979) (credited as Soolyman Rodgie)
Palm Wine Guitar Music: The 60s Sound (1988)
The Palm Wine Sounds of S. E. Rogie (1989)
The New Sounds of S. E. Rogie (1991)
Dead Men Don't Smoke Marijuana (1994)

References

1940s births
1994 deaths
Sierra Leonean guitarists
Sierra Leonean male singers
Highlife musicians
Palm wine musicians
Real World Records artists
20th-century male singers
20th-century guitarists
People from Pujehun District